Netiv HaAsara (lit. Path of the Ten) was a moshav and Israeli settlement in the Sinai Peninsula. Located near Yamit, it was founded in 1973 and was named for ten soldiers that were killed in a helicopter accident south of Rafah in 1971.

After the moshav was evacuated as part of the Camp David Accords, 70 families who had previously lived in the settlement founded a new moshav, also called Netiv HaAsara in the north-western Negev desert in Israel.

Populated places established in 1973
Former Israeli settlements in Sinai
Former moshavim
1973 establishments in the Israeli Military Governorate
1982 disestablishments in the Israeli Military Governorate